Serbian League Vojvodina (Serbian: Српска лига Војводина / Srpska liga Vojvodina) is one of four sections of the Serbian League, the third national tier. The other three sections are Serbian League Belgrade, Serbian League East, and Serbian League West. It began as the "Vojvodina League" in 1958 and obtain the current form in 1995.

Seasons

Members for 2022–23 
The following 16 clubs compete in the Serbian League Vojvodina during the 2022–23 season.

See also
 Serbian League Belgrade
 Serbian League East
 Serbian League West

References

External links
 Football Association of Vojvodina
 Football Association of Serbia

 
Vojvodina
Football in Vojvodina
Amateur association football